Mount Fukushima is, at , the highest massif in the Queen Fabiola Mountains of Antarctica, standing just north of Yamato Glacier. It was discovered in 1960 by the Belgian Antarctic Expedition, under Guido Derom, and was named by Derom after Shin Fukushima, a geophysicist of the Japanese expedition, lost in a violent blizzard near the Japanese station on East Ongul Island in October 1960.

See also
 List of mountains of Queen Maud Land

References

Mountains of Queen Maud Land
Prince Harald Coast